Space is the debut album by Bleach.  It was released in 1996 under Forefront Records.

Track listing
"Eleven" - 3:02
"Perfect Family" - 2:57
"Epidermis Girl" - 3:57
"Tea for Two" - 4:33
"Cold & Turning Blue" - 4:18
"Child of Sod" - 3:23
"Crystals and Cash" - 3:43
"Wonderful" - 3:54
"Cannonball" - 3:56
"Sugarcoated Ways" - 4:14
"Space" - 3:43

References

1996 debut albums
Bleach (American band) albums
ForeFront Records albums